Ayrılık: Aşkta ve Savaşta Filistin (literally Separation: Palestine at Love and War), known in English as Farewell, is a prime time Turkish television series aired on state broadcaster TRT. The series started on 13 October 2009. The concept consultant of the series is columnist Hakan Albayrak in daily Yeni Şafak  who had also been on the board of MV Mavi Marmara during the Gaza flotilla raid, while its script consultant is the trade union leader Yaşar Seyman who is a columnist of the left-wing daily BirGün.

Controversy
The contents of Ayrılık reportedly stirred up controversy and protests among both Israelis and Palestinians for its portrayal of the Arab-Israeli conflict.

Among Israelis
Ayrılık is described as depicting IDF soldiers killing newborn children in cold blood and snatching babies. It sparked angry protests from politicians and the media in Israel. Simon Wiesenthal Center sent a notice on the series to Prime Minister Recep Tayyip Erdoğan. Due to growing concerns, Israeli Foreign Minister Avigdor Lieberman summoned the Turkish ambassador and complained about the antisemitic content of Ayrılık.  Turkish Foreign Minister Ahmet Davutoğlu concluded that the Turkish government is not liable for the series' content.

Among Palestinians
Dubai-based MBC 4 began airing the series in March 2010 and Dubai One had also purchased it. After the series' aired on MBC 1, a female Palestinian prisoner sent an appeal to Palestinian Prisoners' Society on behalf of other female detainees, demanding that the channel stop broadcasting Ayrılık. Female prisoners were reportedly angered by the depiction of a Palestinian female prisoner being raped by Israeli soldiers under detention, saying that it was a distortion of reality. "The series is full of misconceptions," said the woman who appealed, "like when it shows how a female prisoner’s family killed her upon her release...This is humiliating to the entire Palestinian people and only serves the occupation."

See also
Israel–Turkey relations
Zahra's Blue Eyes 
Kurtlar Vadisi

References

External links
Ayrılık at TRT website

Turkish drama television series
2009 Turkish television series debuts
Israel–Turkey relations
2000s Turkish television series
Turkish Radio and Television Corporation original programming
Television shows set in Istanbul
Television series produced in Istanbul
Television series set in the 2010s